Last Hero 5: Super-Game (Posledniy Geroy 5: Super Igra) - 5th season of Russian Last Hero show, hosted by Vladimir Menshov

Contestants

The Total Votes is the number of votes a castaway has received during Tribal Councils where the castaway is eligible to be voted out of the game. It does not include the votes received during the final Tribal Council.

Last Hero seasons
2004 Russian television seasons
Television shows filmed in Panama